Dadabhoy Rustomji 'Dady' Havewala (sometimes spelt Havewalla) (27 November 1908 – 21 July 1982) was an Indian cricketer who played first-class cricket from 1934 to 1941.

Havewala became famous in India before he played first-class cricket. In the final of the Times of India Shield in Bombay in December 1933, he scored 515 (with 32 sixes and 56 fours) as well as taking 11 wickets. It was the highest score in Indian cricket until 2013, when Prithvi Shaw made 546. When Havewala was around 120, a ball bowled by the opposing captain G. N. Lalljee hit the stumps and deflected without dislodging the bails. After reaching 200 he wanted to retire but was asked by his captain Muley to slog and get out. Havewala started to hit out and some of his sixes landed among railway wagons in the Marine Drive yards. He reached his 300 after around a further twenty minutes, and ended the day at 453 not out. A large crowd attended the match on the next day, when Havewala was caught at deep mid off from a mishit.

Havewala made his first first-class century in 1935-36, playing for Bombay against Western India. Earlier in the season he had scored 71 against the touring Australian side, prompting Charlie Macartney to write, "I have seldom seen finer hitting than that by Havewalla."

He made another century in 1937-38 for Maharaja of Patiala's XI against the strong touring English team Lord Tennyson's XI and was selected to play for India in the last two matches India played against Lord Tennyson's XI. He made 44 in the first match, India's second-top score in an innings victory. In later seasons Havewala's batting form declined and he played as a pace bowler.

References

External links
 Dadabhoy Havewala at CricketArchive
 
 "Dadabhoy Havewala: First Indian to score 500 in a senior cricket match"

1908 births
1982 deaths
Indian cricketers
Mumbai cricketers
Parsees cricketers
People from Valsad district